C. ponderosa  may refer to:
 Casmaria ponderosa, a sea snail species
 Cincinnatia ponderosa, the ponderous siltsnail or ponderous spring snail, a gastropod species endemic to the United States

See also
 Ponderosa (disambiguation)